Christopher Frank Foss (mostly written Christopher F. Foss; born 8 April 1946) is a British military author. Since 1970 he has worked for the military publisher Jane's Information Group. He is editor of Jane's Armor and Artillery and co-editor of other Jane's editions.

Life 
Foss was born in Portsmouth to Frank Victor and Doris (née Dorsett) Foss. Foss attended high school in Portsmouth, England. He has been married to Elaine Jean Jenkins since 1972; they have one child, Robert James. Foss is a member of the Fortress Study Group.

Bibliography 
During his career Foss wrote, co-wrote, edited or co-edited, or published about 100 books.

Author 
 Jane's Pocket book of modern tanks and armored fighting vehicles. Macdonald & Jane's, London 1974.
 Artillery of the world. Ian Allan, London 1976. 
 Military vehicles of the world. Ian Allan, London 1976.
 The Illustrated Encyclopedia of the World's Tanks and Fighting Vehicles: a technical directory of major combat vehicles from World War 1 to the present day. Salamander Books, London 1977.
 Armoured Fighting Vehicles of the World. Ian Allan, London 1974.
 Infantry Weapons of the World. Ian Allan, London 1979.
 Jane's Light Tanks and Armoured Cars. Jane's, London 1984.
 Jane's armored personnel carriers. Jane's 1985.
 Ray Bonds (Ed.): The Illustrated Dictionary of Modern Weapons: Warplanes, Tanks, Missiles, Warships, Artillery, Small arms. Salamander Books, London c1985.
 The Vickers Tanks. (with Peter McKenzie). Stephens, 1988.
 Jane's AFV recognition handbook. Jane's, Coulsdon 1992.
 Warrior Mechanized Combat Vehicle, 1987–1994 New Vanguard, (with illustrations by Peter Sarson), Osprey, London 1994.
 Scorpion: Reconnaissance Vehicle, 1972–1994 New Vanguard, (with illustrations by Peter Sarson), Osprey, London 1995.
 Jane's modern tanks. HarperCollins, Glasgow 1995.
 Jane's tank & combat vehicle recognition guide. HarperCollins, Glasgow 1996.
 Modern land combat. (with David Miller), Salamander, London 2001.  
 Jane's Tank recognition guide. Collins, London 2006.
 IHS Jane's land Warfare Platforms: Artillery & air Defence. IHS Jane's / IHS Global, Coulsdon 2012–2016.
 IHS Jane's land Warfare Platforms: System upgrades. IHS Janes / IHS Global, Coulsdon 2012–2016.
 IHS Jane's land Warfare Platforms: Armoured fighting vehicles. IHS Jane's / IHS Global, Coulsdon 2012–2016.

Editor 
 Jane's pocket book of towed artillery. Macdonald and Jane's, London 1974.
 Jane's world armored fighting vehicles. Macdonald 1976.
 Jane's armor and artillery. Jane's Yearbooks, London 1979- [2011]
 An Illustrated guide to World War II tanks and fighting vehicles. Salamander, London c [1981], . (Ray Bonds (ed.)
 Modern military trucks. Jane's, London 1981.
 Modern tanks and armored fighting vehicles. Jane's, London 1981.
 Jane's main battle tanks. Jane's, London 1984. 
 Christopher Foss, Ian Hogg (eds.): Battlefield: The Weapons of Modern land Warfare. Orbis, London 1986.
 Jane's land-based air defense. Jane's Information Group, Coulsdon 1989- [2011]
 Tony Cullen and Christopher F. Foss. (Ed.): Jane's AFV retrofit systems. Jane's Information Group, Coulsdon 1993.
 The encyclopedia of tanks and armored fighting vehicles: the comprehensive guide to over 900 armored fighting vehicles from 1915 to the present day. Spellmount, Staplehurst 2003, 2002.

References 

1946 births
20th-century non-fiction writers
British male writers
British military historians
Historians of weapons
British non-fiction writers
Living people
Male non-fiction writers